The 2017 La Course by Le Tour de France with FDJ was the fourth edition of La Course by Le Tour de France, a women's cycle race held in France. The race was held before stage 18 of the 2017 Tour de France, between Briançon and the Col d'Izoard, on 20 July, and was followed by a pursuit race before stage 20 of the Tour de France. It was organised by the ASO. The first day counted also as the thirteenth race of the 2017 UCI Women's World Tour.

Both races had the same podium; Annemiek van Vleuten won both races ahead of  rider Lizzie Deignan, with the podium being completed each time by 's Elisa Longo Borghini. 

The event was subsequently criticised, with issues regarding the 'pursuit' format, facilities for riders & teams and the desire for a 'Women's Tour de France'.

Route and format
Following criticism by riders regarding the lack of progress towards a multi stage race, ASO announced in October 2016 that the race would remain a one day event but move from the Champs-Élysées in Paris to a mountain stage on the Col d'Izoard.

It was then announced that the race would take place over two days. The top twenty finishers on the first day, or those within five minutes of the stage winner on the Col d'Izoard, were eligible to contest a second  stage, over the same course as the men's time trial in Marseille on 22 July. However, for the purposes of the UCI Women's World Tour, only the results from the first day counted. The pursuit stage was held as a 1.15 categorised event, on the French Cycling Federation (FFC) calendar – and therefore did not count towards the UCI Women's World Tour – with riders starting at their respective time gaps from the Col d'Izoard.

Teams 
21 teams participated in the 2017 La Course by Le Tour de France. The top 15 UCI Women's World Tour teams were automatically invited, and obliged to attend the race.

Results

La Course by Le Tour de France - stage 1

20 July 2017 — Briançon to Col d'Izoard, 

Of the 119 riders to start the race, 47 completed the race within the time limit. 19 riders qualified for La Course Poursuite, as they finished within five minutes of race winner Annemiek van Vleuten.

La Course Poursuite - stage 2

22 July 2017 — Marseille to Marseille,

Criticism
Following the event, the race was criticised by the professional peloton and teams. 

As only 20 riders qualified for the individual pursuit stage, teams were unable to plan logistics to get riders, equipment and team staff to Marseille. Lizzie Deignan subsequently noted that it took 9 hours to get off the mountain and to Marseille, with no police escort offered by organisers. The format of a 'pursuit' stage was thought not to be a success, as the mountain stage resulting in large time gaps that riders could not make up. Riders also criticised the facilities available in Marseille, with a lack of female toilets. The absence of TV coverage on the screens in the Stade Vélodrome where thee stage started and finished was also criticised. 

Teams and riders also criticised the move away from Paris, noting the attraction of the stage for sponsors. Campaigner Kathryn Bertine stated her disappointment that the race had not evolved into a multi day stage race, with former cyclist & commentator Joanna Rowsell stating that "We need mountain climbs, flat stages, time trials and a Champs-Elysees finish". 

The 2018 event reverted to a single day event, albeit remaining a mountain stage. In 2022, Tour de France Femmes held its first edition, to praise from the professional peloton, teams and media.

See also
 2017 in women's road cycling

References

External links
 

2017 UCI Women's World Tour
2017
2017 in French sport